Widacz  is a village in the administrative district of Gmina Miejsce Piastowe, within Krosno County, Subcarpathian Voivodeship, in south-eastern Poland.

The village has a population of 870.

References

Widacz